Pratt Field is the football field of Amherst College, constructed in 1891. Considered the third-oldest college NCAA football site in the nation, the field was renovated in 2015 to include a new field house, track, and a shifted playing field.

References

Amherst Mammoths football
College lacrosse venues in the United States
American football venues in Massachusetts
Lacrosse venues in the United States
Multi-purpose stadiums in the United States
Buildings and structures in Amherst, Massachusetts
Sports venues completed in 1891
1891 establishments in Massachusetts